Leumeah High School is a government-funded co-educational comprehensive secondary day school, located in , a south-western suburb of Sydney, New South Wales, Australia.

Established in 1977, the school caters for approximately 750 students from Year 7 to Year 12. The school is operated by the New South Wales Department of Education; the principal of the establishment is Christina Mateus.

Newsletter 
Leumeah High's newsletter within the school's environment is known as 'The Link', released every 3-5 weeks on average. It consists of events occurring throughout the school, and advancements being made to improve student learning.

Finance 
Financial summary gathered from Leumeah High School's 2020 annual report:

See also 

 List of government schools in New South Wales
 Education in Australia

References 

Leumeah, New South Wales
Public high schools in Sydney
Educational institutions established in 1977
1977 establishments in Australia
School buildings completed in 1977